Waddington is a civil parish in Ribble Valley, Lancashire, England.  It contains 23 listed buildings that are recorded in the National Heritage List for England.  Of these, one is at Grade II*, the middle grade, and the others are at Grade II, the lowest grade.  The parish includes the village of Waddington, and surrounding countryside.  Many of the listed buildings are houses or farmhouses and associated structures.  Also listed are a church and structures in the churchyard, bridges, a war memorial, and the village stocks.

Key

Buildings

References

Citations

Sources

Lists of listed buildings in Lancashire
Buildings and structures in Ribble Valley